Deori (also Deuri) is a Tibeto-Burman language in the Sino-Tibetan language family spoken by the Deori people of Assam and Arunachal Pradesh. Among the four territorial groups only the Dibongiya have retained the language. The others—Patorgoyan, Tengaponiya, and Borgoyan—have shifted to Assamese. It is spoken in Lohit district of Arunachal Pradesh, and in Lakhimpur, Dhemaji, Tinsukia, and Jorhat districts of Assam.

In the colonial times this language became associated with the Chutia people erroneously, and came to be known as the "Chutia language" in the Linguistic Survey of India. Modern scholarship do not associate the Deori language with the Chutia community.

The Deori language is one of the most influential languages which has helped develop the Assamese language in Upper Assam.

However, the word for water has a similar form in many other languages of the Sal branch of Sino-Tibetan to which Deori belongs, so it is not conclusive evidence that Deori speakers were the first to occupy this area.

Vocabulary 

Some of the words of Deori language present in Assamese derived from the dictionary Chuperemago are:

References

Bibliography

Further reading 
 Acharyya, Prarthana & Shakuntala Mahanta. (2018). Production and perception of lexical tone in Deori. Sixth International Symposium on Tonal Aspects of Languages (TAL), June 18–20, 2018, Berlin, Germany. 93–97. doi:10.21437/TAL.2018-19.
 Goswami, Upendranath. (1994). An introduction to the Deori language. Guwahati: Anundoram Borooah Institute of Language, Art, and Culture.
 Jacquesson, François. (2005). Le Deuri: Langue Tibéto-Birmane d’Assam. Leuven: Peeters Publishers.
 Mahanta, Shakuntala, Indranil Dutta, & Prarthana Acharyya. (2017). Lexical tone in Deori: loss, contrast, and word-based alignment. In Honeybone, Patrick, Julian Bradfield, Josef Fruehwald, Pavel Losad, Benjamin Ress Molin- eaux, & Michael Ramsammy (eds.), Papers in Historical Phonology 2. 51–87. doi:10.2218/pihph.2.2017.1906.
 Nath, Arup Kumar. (2010). A lexico semantic study of Tiwa and Deori: Two endangered languages of the Tibeto Burman Family. New Delhi: Jawaharlal Nehru University (Doctoral dissertation). http://hdl.handle.net/10603/31796.
 Saikia, Sangeeta. (2012). A socio-linguistic survey of Deori speech community. Gauhati: Gauhati University (Doctoral dissertation).
 Saikia, Sangeeta. (2013). Deuri Asomar Bhasha. In Devy, Ganesh Narayandas (ed.), Peoples Linguistic Survey of India 5(2). 3-15. India: Orient Blackswan Private Limited.

Sal languages
Languages of Assam
Languages of Arunachal Pradesh
Endangered languages of India